Joanídia Núñez Sodré (22 December 19031975) was a Brazilian music educator, pianist, conductor and composer.

Biography
Joanídia Sodré was born in Porto Alegre. When she was four years old, her family moved to Rio de Janeiro where she studied piano with Alberto Nepomuceno. Later she graduated from the National Institute of Music, where she studied music with Henrique Oswald, Agnello França and Francisco Braga.

After completing her studies at age 22, she became professor of harmony of the National Institute of Music. In 1927 she received a grant to study at the National Conservatory in Berlin. On returning to Brazil, she founded the Youth Orchestra and became one of the first conductors to lead the Brazilian Orquestra da Sociedade de Concertos Sinfônicos. She became the first woman director of the National School of Music (Music School of the Federal University) in 1946 where she served until 1967. She was also vice-chancellor of the University of Brazil and dean for almost a year. She died in Rio de Janeiro.

Works
Selected works include:
Casa Forte, opera
Trio
String Quartet
String Quartet

References

1903 births
1975 deaths
20th-century classical composers
Brazilian music educators
Women classical composers
Brazilian classical composers
Women music educators
20th-century women composers